The 1953 Macdonald Brier, the Canadian men's national curling championship, was held from March 2 to 7, 1953 at Sudbury Arena in Sudbury, Ontario. A total of 12,500 fans attended the event.

Both Team Manitoba and Team Quebec finished round robin play tied with 8-2 records, necessitating a tiebreaker playoff to determine the Brier championship. Manitoba, who was skipped by Ab Gowanlock defeated Quebec in the playoff 8–6 to capture the Brier Tankard. This was Manitoba's fourteenth Brier championship and Gowanlock's second title as a skip with his other title coming in 1938.

The 15 years between Brier championships by Gowanlock set a record for the longest gap between Brier championships by a skip, which to date is still a record. The title gap is also still a record by any player (since equaled by Steve Gould in 1996 and 2011 as a lead). At 52 years of age, Gowanlock is to date the oldest Brier winning skip in history.

Event Summary
Heading into the final draw, Quebec was sitting at 8–1 with Saskatchewan still left to play. Manitoba had already completed their round robin portion with an 8–2 record, thus drawing a bye in the final draw. All Quebec needed was a victory over Saskatchewan to capture their first Brier championship while Manitoba needed a Quebec loss to force a tiebreaker to decide the Brier championship.

In the final draw, Quebec led 3-1 after four ends, but Saskatchewan would score three in the fifth end and go on to steal three more in the next two ends and eventually won 9–5 to force a tiebreaker between Manitoba and Quebec for the Brier championship.

In the tiebreaker, Quebec led Manitoba 2-1 after four ends. Manitoba then scored one in the fifth end to tie the game and steal one in the sixth and two in the seventh to take a 5–2 lead. Quebec responded with three in the eighth and a steal of one in the ninth to take a 6–5 lead. Manitoba tied the game in the tenth and took a 7–6 lead after a steal of one in the eleventh. Even though Quebec had shot rock in the last end, Manitoba would go onto steal one more and win 8–6 to capture their fourteenth Brier championship and the second for Gowanlock as skip.

Teams
The teams are listed as follows:

Round robin standings

Round robin results

Draw 1

Draw 2

Draw 3

Draw 4

Draw 5

Draw 6

Draw 7

Draw 8

Draw 9

Draw 10

Draw 11

Playoff

Notes

References

External links 
 Video: 

Macdonald Brier, 1953
Macdonald Brier, 1953
The Brier
Curling competitions in Greater Sudbury
Macdonald Brier
Macdonald Brier